This is a list of cities, towns and villages in the county of Herefordshire, England.

A
Abbey Dore
Abcott
Acton Beauchamp
Acton Green
Adforton
Alder's End
Allensmore
Almeley
Almeley Wooton
Altbough
Amberley
Archenfield
Arrow Green
Ashfield
Ashley Moor
Ashperton
Ashton
Aston
Aston
Aston Crews
Aston Ingham
Auberrow
Aulden
Aylestone Hill
Aylton
Aymestrey

B
Bacton
Bagwyllydiart
Ballingham
Ballingham Hill
Bank Street
Barland
Barnfields
Barons' Cross
Bartestree
Barton Court
Bartonsham
Batchcott
Batchfields
Baysham
Bearwood
Beavan's Hill
Beggars Ash
Berrow Green
Bicton
Birchall
Birchend
Bircher
Birley
Birtley
Bishon Common
Bishops Frome
Bishopstone
Blacklands
Blackmarstone
Blackwardine
Blakemere
Bleak Acre
Bockleton
Bodenham
Bodenham Bank
Bodenham Moor
Bolstone
Bosbury
Bowley
Bowley Lane
Bowley Town
Bradlow
Bradnor Green
Brampton Abbotts
Brampton Bryan
Brand Green
Brandhill
Bredenbury
Bredwardine
Breinton Common
Brelston Green
Bridge End
Bridge Sollers
Bridstow
Brierley
Brilley
Brilley Mountain
Brimfield
Bringewood Forge
Bringsty Common
Brinkley Hill
Brinsop
Brinsop Common
Broad Green
Broad Heath
Broad Oak
Broadmoor Common
Broadward
Broadway Lands
Brobury
Brockhampton
Brockmanton
Bromsash
Bromyard
Bromyard Downs
Bronydd
Broome
Broom's Green
Broomy Hill
Brown's End
Broxwood
Buckton
Bullinghope
Bull's Hill
Burcher
Burghill
Burley Gate
Burmash
Burrington
Bush Bank
Bycross
Byford
Byford Common
Byton
Byton Hand

C
Callow
Callow Hill
Callow Marsh
Calver Hill
Canon Bridge
Canon Frome
Canon Pyon
Carey
Carterspiece
Castle Frome
Catley Southfield
Chance's Pitch
Chandler's Cross
Chase End Street
Checkley
Chickward
Cholstrey
Churchfield
Clehonger
Clencher's Mill
Clifford
Clifton-upon-Teme
Clock Mills
Clodock
Clouds
Cobhall Common
Cobnash
Cock Gate
Cockshoot
Cockyard
Coddington
Collington
Collins Green
Colwall
Colwall Green
Colwall Stone
Combe
Combe Moor
Comberton
Common Hill
Cornett
Coughton
Covender
Coxall
Cradley
Craswell
Credenhill
Crick's Green
Crizeley
Crocker's Ash
Croft
Cross Llyde
Crossway
Crossway
Crow Hill
Crowther's Pool
Crozen
Crumpton Hill
Cupid's Hill
Cusop

D
Dancing Green
Darbys Green
Didley
Dilwyn
Dinedor
Dinedor Cross
Discoed
Docklow
Dodmarsh
Dol-y-cannau
Dolyhir
Donnington
Dormington
Dorstone
Dulas
Durlow Common
Duxmoor

E
Eardisland
Eardisley
East Dean
Easthampton
Eastnor
Eastwood
Eaton
Eaton Bishop
Eau Withington
Ebnall
Edvin Loach
Edwyn Ralph
Eign Hill
Elms Green
Elsdon
Elton
Elton's Marsh
English Bicknor
Enmore Field
Even Pits
Evendine
Evesbatch
Ewyas Harold
Eye
Eyton

F
Fairfields
Falcon
Fawley Chapel
Felton
Fiddler's Green
Field
Field's Place
Fine Street
Fishpool
Five Bridges
Flaggoners Green
Flintsham
Floodgates
Ford
Fownhope
Fox Hill
Foxley
Foy
Franklands Gate
Fromes Hill
Fromington

G
Ganarew
Garway
Garway Hill
Gelli Gandryll
Gilfach
Glewstone
Golden Valley
Golder Field
Goodrich
Goose Pool
Gorsley Common
Gosford
Grafton
Grantsfield
Great Doward
Green Crize
Green Lane
Greenhill
Greete
Grendon Bishop
Grendon Green
Greytree
Grittlesend
Grove

H
Hagley
Hales Bank
Hales Wood
Hallwood Green
Halmond's Frome
Ham Green
Hamnish Clifford
Hampton Bishop
Hampton Park
Hardwicke
Harewood End
Hatfield
Haven
Haven
Hawkersland Cross
Headbrook
Heath
Hengoed
Hereford
High Lane
Highway
Hildersley
Hill Gate
Hillend Green
Hillhampton
Hinton
Hipplecote
Hoarwithy
Hole-in-the-Wall
Hollybush
Holme Lacy
Holme Marsh
Holmer
Holywell
Hom Green
Hope Mansell
Hope under Dinmore
Hope's Rough
Hopley's Green
Horseway Head
How Caple
Howton
Humber
Hunderton
Hungerstone
Huntington
Huntington
Hurstley
Hyde

I
Ivington

J
Jay

K
Kenchester
Kentchurch
Kerne Bridge
Kerry's Gate
Kiln Green
Kilpeck
Kimbolton
King's Acre
King's Caple
King's Pyon
King's Thorn
Kingsfield
Kingsland
Kingstone
Kingstone
Kingswood
Kington
Kinnersley
Kinnerton
Kinton
Kivernoll
Knapton Green
Knightwick
Knill
Kymin
Kynaston
Kyre
Kyre Green
Kyre Park
Kyrewood

L
Lady Halton
Ladyridge
Lane End
Larport
Lawton
Lea
Lea Line
Ledbury
Leddington
Ledgemoor
Ledicot
Leinthall Earls
Leinthall Starkes
Leintwardine
Leominster
Letton
Letton
Leys Hill
Leysters
Limebrook
Lingen
Linley Green
Linton
Linton Hill
Lintridge
Litmarsh
Little Birch
Little Cowarne
Little Dewchurch
Little Doward
Little Garway
Little Gorsley
Little Hereford
Little Hill
Little Malvern
Little Marcle
Little Merthyr
Little Tarrington
Little Welland
Llancloudy
Llangarron
Llangrove
Llanrothal
Llanthony
Llanveynoe
Llanwarne
Longtown
Longworth
Lower Bearwood
Lower Breinton
Lower Buckenhill
Lower Bullingham
Lower Burton
Lower Egleton
Lower Grove Common
Lower Hardwick
Lower Harpton
Lower Hergest
Lower Kinsham
Lower Lye
Lower Maes-coed
Lower Rabber
Lower Sapey
Lower Southfield
Lower Todding
Lower Town
Lower Welson
Lower Wyche
Loxter
Lucton
Ludford
Ludstock
Lugg Green
Lugwardine
Lulham
Lulsley
Luston
Luxley
Lyde Cross
Lyne Down
Lyonshall

M
Madley
Mansell Gamage
Mansell Lacy
Marden
Marl Bank
Marlas
Marlbrook
Marlow
Marston
Marston Stannett
Marstow
Martley
Mathon
Maund Bryan
Meadow Green
Meer Common
Merbach
Merton, 
Merrivale
Michaelchurch
Michaelchurch Escley
Michaelchurch-on-Arrow
Middle Maes-coed
Middleton
Middleton on the Hill
Millhalf
Milton
Moccas
Monkhide
Monkland
Monmarsh
Monmouth Cap
Monnington on Wye
Moorcot
Moorend Cross
Moorhampton
Mordiford
Moreton
Moreton Jeffries
Moreton-on-Lugg
Mortimer's Cross
Much Birch
Much Cowarne
Much Dewchurch
Much Marcle
Munderfield Row
Munderfield Stocks
Munsley
Munstone
Mynd

N
Nash
Netherton
New Mills
Newcastle
Newchurch
Newman's Place
Newton
Newton
Newton
Newton
Newtown
Newtown
Newtown
Nextend
Norbridge
Norton Canon

O
Ocle Pychard
Old Country
Old Forge
Old Gore
Old Wharf
Orcop
Orcop Hill
Orleton
Orleton Common
Overton

P
Panks Bridge
Paradise Green
Parkway
Parton
Peartree Green
Pembridge
Pen-allt
Pencombe
Pencraig
Penguithal
Penrhos
Pen-y-park
Perrystone Hill
Perton
Peterchurch
Peterstow
Phocle Green
Picken End
Pikestye
Pipe and Lyde
Pixley
Pontrilas
Pontshill
Pool Head
Poolbrook
Poolmill
Portway
Pow Green
Preston Marsh
Preston Wynne
Preston-on-Wye
Prior's Frome
Priory Wood
Pudleston
Putley
Putley Common
Putley Green
Putson

Q

R
Ravenhills Green
Readings
Red Hill
Red Rail
Rhydspence
Richards Castle
Ridgeway Cross
Risbury
Rodd
Rodd Hurst
Ross-on-Wye
Rotherwas
Rowland's Green
Rowlestone
Ruckhall
Rudhall
Rushall
Rushock
Ruxton
Ruxton Green
Ryelands
Ryton

S
Saffron's Cross
Sapey Bridge
Sapey Common
Sarnesfield
Sellack
Sellack Boat
Shaw Common
Shelwick
Shelwick Green
Shenmore
Shirl Heath
Shobdon
Shucknall
Shutton
Snodhill
Sollers Dilwyn
Sollers Hope
St Margarets
St Michaels()
St Owen's Cross
St Weonards
Stagbatch
Stanford Bishop
Stanford Bridge
Stanford-on-Teme
Stanley Hill
Stansbatch
Stapleton
Staplow
Staunton on Arrow
Staunton-on-Wye
Steen's Bridge
Steventon
Stocking
Stockton
Stoke Bliss
Stoke Cross
Stoke Edith
Stoke Hill
Stoke Lacy
Stoke Lane
Stoke Prior
Stoneyard Green
Stony Cross
Stony Cross
Stony Cross
Storridge
Stowe
Stowfield
Strangford
Stretford
Stretford Court
Stretton Grandison
Stretton Sugwas
Sugwas Pool
Sunset
Sutton Lakes
Sutton Marsh
Sutton St Michael
Sutton St Nicholas, Herefordshire
Sutton Walls
Swainshill
Sweet Green
Swinmore Common
Symonds Yat

T
Tarrington
Tarrington Common
Tedstone Delamere
Tedstone Wafer
The Bage
The Cleaver
The Fording
The Forge
The Hundred
The Knapp
The Lonk
The Marsh
The Moors
The Pludds
The Rhydd
The Riddle
The Vauld
The Weaven
The Wymm
Thorn
Thornbury
Three Ashes
Thruxton
Tidnor
Tillers' Green
Tillington
Tillinton Common
Titley
Totnor
Tram Inn
Treaddow
Tretire
Trumpet
Tudorville
Tumpy Lakes
Tupsley
Turkey Tump
Turnastone
Twyford Common
Tyberton

U
Ullingswick
Upcott
Uphampton
Upper Breinton
Upper Broxwood
Upper Buckenhill
Upper Colwall
Upper Dormington
Upper Egleton
Upper Grove Common
Upper Hamnish
Upper Hardwick
Upper Hergest
Upper Hill
Upper Kinsham
Upper Lyde
Upper Lye
Upper Maes-coed
Upper Rochford
Upper Sapey
Upper Town
Upper Welland
Upper Welson
Upper Wyche
Upton Bishop
Upton Crews
Urdimarsh

V
Veldo
Venn's Green
Vowchurch
Vowchurch Common

W
Wacton
Walford, Leintwardine
Walford, Ross-on-Wye
Walker's Green
Waller's Green
Walson
Walterstone
Walton
Wants Green
Warden
Warham
Wayend Street
Wellington
Wellington Heath
Welsh Bicknor
Welsh Newton
Welsh Newton Common
Weobley
Weobley Marsh
West Lydiatt
West Malvern
West Town
Westbrook
Westfield
Westfields
Westhide
Westhope
Weston
Weston Beggard
Weston under Penyard
Wharton
Whitbourne
Whitchurch
White Cross
White Rocks
White Stone
Whitechurch Maund
Whiteleaved Oak
Whitney-on-Wye
Whitton
Whitton
Whyle
Widemarsh
Wigmore
Willersley
Wilson
Wilton
Winforton
Winnal
Winnal Common
Winslow Mill
Withington
Withington Marsh
Wofferwood Common
Wolferlow
Womaston
Wood End
Woolhope
Woolhope Cockshoot
Woonton
Woonton
Wootton
Wormbridge
Wormbridge Common
Wormelow Tump
Wormsley
Wylde
Wynds Point
Wynn's Green
Wyson

Y
Yarkhill
Yarpole
Yarsop
Yatton
Yazor

See also
List of settlements in Herefordshire by population
List of places in England 

 
Herefordshire
Places
Herefordshire